Melina Petriella (born March 2, 1976) is an Argentine movie and television actress.

Filmography
 Besos en la frente (1996)
 Esperando al Mesías (2000) aka Waiting for the Messiah
 Nocturno (2001)
 El Abrazo partido (2004) aka Lost Embrace
 Dolores de casada (2004)
 Miss Tacuarembó (2010)
 Quiero morir en tus brazos (2013)

Television
 Inconquistable corazón (1994)
 R.R.D.T (1998)
 Gasoleros (1998)
 Calientes (2000)
 Luna salvaje (2000) aka Wild Moon
 El Sodero de mi vida (2001)
 Tiempofinal (2001)
 El Precio del poder (2002)
 Son amores (2002) aka Sweethearts
 Rincón de luz (2003) aka Little House of Light
 Dolores de casada (2004)
 Padre Coraje (2004) aka Brave Father John
 Amor en custodia (2005)
 Collar de esmeraldas (2006)
 Don Juan y su bella dama (2008)
 Volver a nacer (2012)
 Cuatro Reinas (2015)

Awards
Nominations
 Argentine Film Critics Association Awards: Silver Condor, Best New Actress, for Esperando al mesías; 2001.

External links
 
 

1976 births
Argentine film actresses
Argentine Jews
Jewish Argentine actresses
Living people
Place of birth missing (living people)